Eureka Township is a township in Barton County, Kansas, USA.  As of the 2010 census, its population was 82.

Eureka Township was organized in 1878.

Geography
According to the USGS, it contains one cemetery, Walnut Valley.

References
 USGS Geographic Names Information System (GNIS)

External links
 City-Data.com

Townships in Barton County, Kansas
Townships in Kansas